Ferdinand I (31 October 1345 – 22 October 1383), sometimes called the Handsome or occasionally the Inconstant, was the King of Portugal from 1367 until his death in 1383. His death led to the 1383–85 crisis, also known as the Portuguese interregnum.

Life
Ferdinand was born in Coimbra, the second but eldest surviving son of Peter I and his wife, Constanza Manuel. On the death of Peter of Castile in 1369, Ferdinand, as great-grandson of Sancho IV by his grandmother Beatrice, laid claim to the vacant Castilian throne. The kings of Aragon and Navarre, and later John of Gaunt, Duke of Lancaster, who had married Peter of Castile's eldest daughter, Constance, also claimed the throne.

The throne was held by his second cousin Henry of Trastámara (Henry II of Castile), Peter of Castile's illegitimate brother, who had defeated him in the Castilian Civil War in 1366 and assumed the crown. After one or two indecisive campaigns, all parties were ready to accept the mediation of Pope Gregory XI. The conditions of the treaty, ratified in 1371, included a marriage between Ferdinand and Leonora of Castile. But before the union could take place Ferdinand had become passionately attached to Leonor Telles de Meneses, the wife of one of his own courtiers. Having procured a dissolution of her previous marriage, he lost no time in making Leonor his queen.

This conduct, although it raised a serious insurrection in Portugal, did not at once result in a war with Henry.  However, the outward concord was soon disturbed by intrigues with John of Gaunt, Duke of Lancaster, brother of Edward the Black Prince, who entered into a secret treaty with Ferdinand for the expulsion of Henry from his throne. The war which followed was unsuccessful; and peace was again made in 1373.

On the death of Henry in 1379, the Duke of Lancaster once more put forward his claims, and again found an ally in Portugal. According to the Continental annalists, the English proved as offensive to their allies as to their enemies in the field. So Ferdinand made a peace for himself at Badajoz in 1382. It stipulated that Beatrice, Ferdinand's daughter and heiress, would marry King John I of Castile, and thus secure the ultimate union of the two crowns.

Ferdinand left no male heir when he died, probably from poisoning, at  Lisbon on  22 October 1383, and the direct Burgundian line, which had been in possession of the throne since the days of Count Henry (about 1112), became extinct. The stipulations of the treaty of Badajoz were set aside, and John, Grand Master of the order of Aviz, Ferdinand's illegitimate brother, claimed the throne. This led to a period of war and political indefinition known as the 1383-1385 Crisis.  John became the first king of the House of Aviz in 1385.

Ferdinand's spectacular ornate tomb can be found on display at the Carmo Archaeological Museum in Lisbon. His body was destroyed during the Invasions of Portugal, when he was still buried in Santarém, and was never recovered.

Marriages and descendants
Fernando married Leonor Teles de Meneses, formerly the wife of the nobleman João Lourenço da Cunha, Lord of Pombeiro, and daughter of Martim Afonso Telo de Meneses.

Ancestry

References

Bibliography 
 García Oro, José (1987): Galicia en los siglos XIV y XV. Fundación "Pedro Barrie de la Maza, Conde de Fenosa", A Coruña. . 
 Varela Fernandes, Carla (2009): The Image of a King. Analysis of the tomb of King D. Fernando I. Carmo Archaeological Museum/Portuguese Archaeologists Association, Lisbon. (English ed.)

Portuguese infantes
House of Burgundy-Portugal
1345 births
1383 deaths
People from Coimbra
14th-century Portuguese monarchs
Sons of kings
Royal reburials